Alex Thomas Joseph (born July 6, 1988) is a former American football linebacker. He has been a member of the San Francisco 49ers and the Green Bay Packers.

Professional career

NFL
After going undrafted in the 2010 NFL Draft, Joseph signed with the Green Bay Packers on April 30, 2010. He was released by the Packers before the season began.

Afterwards, he spent time in the practice squads for the Oakland Raiders and Carolina Panthers before being signed to the San Francisco 49ers. He was released by the 49ers on September 3, 2011.

CFL
On April 10, 2012, Joseph signed with the Hamilton Tiger-Cats of the Canadian Football League.

He was the Football/ facility Director for BlueStreak Sports Training, located in Stamford, Connecticut. Alex is now the cofounder of Xenhouse training located in Stamford, Connecticut.

References

External links
Just Sports Stats

Sportspeople from Bridgeport, Connecticut
San Francisco 49ers players
American football linebackers
Temple Owls football players
1988 births
Living people
Oakland Raiders players
Carolina Panthers players
Hamilton Tiger-Cats players
Trenton Freedom players
Green Bay Packers players
Stamford High School (Stamford, Connecticut) alumni